Stephen "Steve" Douglas  (born 17 November 1977 from Bromley, London) is a former English professional darts player. His nickname was The Game.

Career

Douglas won the 1995 WDF Europe Youth Cup, and made his BDO World Darts Championship debut in 2000. He defeated Gary Spedding in the first round before losing to eventual champion Ted Hankey in the second round.

Douglas returned to the BDO World Championship stage in 2011, losing 0-3 in the first round to Gary Robson. He has also appeared in the Last 16 of the World Masters in 2009 and again in 2011.
Douglas qualified for the World Championship again in 2012, and again was drawn against Robson in the first round.  On this occasion, Douglas defeated Robson 3-0. He was defeated in the second round by Paul Jennings.
He was the main administrator of the BDO's Players Forum, along with John Leatherbarrow and Lucy Evenden.

Douglas entered PDC Q School in January 2014, but only entered three of the four days and failed to win enough games to acquire a tour card. However, by participating he gained PDPA membership which gave him entry into certain events. In May, he beat two-time world champion Adrian Lewis on his way to the last 16 of a PDC event for the first time at the 10th Players Championship of the year, where he lost 6–1 to Tony Newell. He was defeated in two Challenge Tour finals during the year to Mark Frost 5–1 and Matt Clark 5–4 (after having been 4–2 ahead). This helped Douglas to finish eighth on the Challenge Tour Order of Merit. 

In 2015 he participated in the Qualifying School to renew his tour card due to him being ranked outside the top 64. Douglas earned a two-year tour card on day three of four with a 5–4 victory over Jermaine Wattimena. At the UK Open he enjoyed wins over Mark Robinson, John Bowles and Andy Boulton to reach the third round where John Henderson ended his run with a 9–7 victory. A sole last 32 exit was his best result during the rest of the year.

World Championship Performances

BDO

 2000: 2nd Round (lost to Ted Hankey 0–3)
 2011: 1st Round (lost to Gary Robson 0–3)
 2012: 2nd Round (lost to Paul Jennings 2–4)
 2013: 2nd Round (lost to Tony O'Shea 1–4)

Personal life

Douglas suffered a heart attack on 13 December 2012  and required a stent to be fitted after a blood clot was found in his coronary artery.

References

External links
Steve Douglas' official website

BDO Darts Players Forum

1977 births
Living people
English darts players
British Darts Organisation players